Jayne Parker is a British artist and film-maker.

She studied sculpture at Canterbury College of Art and Experimental Media at the Slade, where she is now Head of Graduate Fine Art Media.

Her films have been shown in art galleries and museums in the UK and internationally, as well as at cinemas and film festivals, music festivals and on television. In 2003 she was the recipient of the 1871 Fellowship hosted by the Ruskin School of Drawing, Oxford and the San Francisco Art Institute, researching the relationship between music and film.

References

1957 births
Living people
British women artists
British women film directors
Alumni of the Slade School of Fine Art